The 1913 Princeton Tigers football team represented Princeton University in the 1913 college football season. The team finished with a 5–2–1 record under first-year head coach Walter G. Andrews. Princeton tackle Harold Ballin was selected as a consensus first-team honoree on the 1913 College Football All-America Team.

Schedule

References

Princeton
Princeton Tigers football seasons
Princeton Tigers football